Trond Bjørnsen (born 24 August 1975) is a retired Norwegian football midfielder.

He came through the youth ranks of Viking FK, being drafted into the senior team in 1994. Never breaking through, he continued in the city's second-best club FK Vidar from 1996. In 1998 he returned to the top tier and Lillestrøm SK, then Bryne FK from 2000 to 2003. After that he retired to focus on law studies. In the summer of 2004 he nonetheless signed for minnows Rosseland IL.

References

1975 births
Living people
Norwegian footballers
Viking FK players
FK Vidar players
Lillestrøm SK players
Bryne FK players
Norwegian First Division players
Eliteserien players
Association football midfielders